The Otherly Opus is an album by Joy Electric, released on March 20, 2007 on Tooth & Nail Records. Thematically, the album is split in two halves. The first half is known as The Otherly Opus, while the second half is The Memory of Alpha, a mini concept album about antediluvian times.

Track listing 
 "The Otherly Opus" – 3:12
 "Frivolity and its Necessities" – 3:10
 "Colours in Dutch" – 2:38
 "The Ushering In of the Magical Era" – 5:15
 "Write Your Last Paragraph" – 3:30
 "The Memory of Alpha" – 3:27
 "Red Will Dye these Snows of Silver" – 2:26
 "(The Timbre of) The Timber Colony" – 3:06
 "Ponderance Need Not Know" – 2:56
 "A Glass to Count All the Hours" – 3:14

References

External links 
 Official site
 Joy Electric at MySpace

Joy Electric albums
Tooth & Nail Records albums
2007 albums